The FIBA Oceania Under-18 Championship for Women is an under-18 basketball championship in the International Basketball Federation's FIBA Oceania zone that was inaugurated in 2004. The tournament is now known as the FIBA Under-17 Women's Oceania Championship.

As of 2017, the previously known as FIBA Oceania Under-18 competition (which was a qualifier for the World Cup) would now be an Under-17 competition for Oceania teams to qualify through to the Asian Championship (from which they can then qualify for the World Cup).

Summaries

Oceania Under-18 Championship

Oceania Under-17 Championship

Medal table

Participation details

References

 
Women's basketball competitions in Oceania between national teams
Oceania